Genrikh Kasparyan (27 February 1910 in Tbilisi – 27 December 1995 in Yerevan) was a Soviet chess player. He is considered to have been one of the greatest composers of chess endgame studies.  Outside Armenia, he is better known by the Russian version of his name Genrikh Moiseyevich Kasparyan or Kasparian.

Kasparyan became a national master in 1936 and an international master in 1950. He was awarded the titles of International Judge of Chess Compositions in 1956 and International Grandmaster of Chess Composition in 1972, the first composer to receive this title from FIDE .

Kasparyan was also an active chess player, winning the Armenian championship ten times (from 1934 to 1956, including two ties with future World Champion Tigran Petrosian) and the Tiflis championship three times (1931, 1937, 1945). He reached the USSR Championship finals four times (1931, 1937, 1947, 1952), but never finished higher than tenth place.

Kasparyan is best known for his compositions.  He started with chess problems, mainly three-movers, but soon discovered that his best field was in endgame studies.  He wrote several books and collections and composed about 600 studies, many on the theme of domination, winning 57 first prizes. He won the USSR Composing Championship several times .

Sample study
Irving Chernev included five of Kasparyan's compositions in his book 200 Brilliant Endgames.  This study uses a "model mate" in the middle of the board.

Most famous combination from practical play
Apart from being a prolific composer of chess problems Kasparyan was, as mentioned above, an excellent tournament player. One of his games has found its way into countless books on chess tactics:

1. d4 g6 2. b3 Bg7 3. Bb2 d6 4. e4 f5 5. exf5 Bxf5 6. g3 Nc6 7. Bg2 Qd7 8. f4 O-O-O 9. Nf3 a5 10. Nc3 Nf6 11. Qd2 Ne4 12. Nxe4 Bxe4 13. a4 Rhe8 14. Bc3 b6 15. O-O-O Kb7 16. Rhe1 Bd5 17. Re2 e5 18. Rde1 exf4 19. Rxe8 Rxe8 20. Qxf4 Ka6 21. Qh4 Rh8 22. Rd1 Qc8 23. Rd3 Be6 24. d5 Bxc3 25. Rxc3 Bxd5         (diagram)         26. Rxc6! Bxc6 27. Qc4+ Kb7 28. Qxc6+!! Kxc6 29. Ne5++ Kc5 30. Nd3+ Kd4 31. Kd2!! 1–0

Books
 Domination in 2,545 Endgame Studies by Genrikh Kasparyan. 
 The Complete Studies of Genrikh Kasparyan by A. J. Roycroft.
 888 Miniature Studies by Genrikh Moiseyevich Kasparian.

Notable games
Vitaly Chekhover vs. Genrikh Kasparian, Erevan, Match 1936, King's Indian Defense: Fianchetto Variation, Classical Fianchetto (E67), 0–1
Genrikh Kasparian vs. David Bronstein, Ch URS 1947, Sicilian Defense: Grand Prix Attack (B23), 1–0
Genrikh Kasparian vs. Anatoly Ufimtsev, Ch URS 1947, Reti Opening: Anglo-Slav, Bogoljubow Variation Stonewall Line (A12), 1–0

Notes

References
 
  
  http://www.saunalahti.fi/~stniekat/pccc/hcc.htm

External links

Grandmaster Games Database – Genrikh Kasparyan
Selected studies by Kasparyan at Arves.org

1910 births
1995 deaths
Armenian chess players
Soviet chess players
Chess players from Georgia (country)
Chess composers
20th-century Armenian writers
Writers from Georgia (country)
Chess International Masters
Chess writers
Grandmasters for chess composition
Honoured Masters of Sport of the USSR
Sportspeople from Tbilisi
Georgian people of Armenian descent
Armenian male writers
20th-century chess players